Zephaniah 2 is the second chapter of the Book of Zephaniah in the Hebrew Bible or the Old Testament of the Christian Bible. This book contains the prophecies attributed to the prophet Zephaniah, and is a part of the Book of the Twelve Minor Prophets. This chapter contains a call to penitence and oracles against nations.

Text
The original text was written in Hebrew language. This chapter is divided into 15 verses.

Textual witnesses
Some early manuscripts containing the text of this chapter in Hebrew are of the Masoretic Text tradition, which includes the Codex Cairensis (895), the Petersburg Codex of the Prophets (916), Aleppo Codex (10th century), Codex Leningradensis (1008). Fragments containing parts of this chapter in Hebrew were found among the Dead Sea Scrolls, including 4Q77 (4QXIIb; 150–125 BCE) with extant verses 13–15; 4Q78 (4QXIIc; 75–50 BCE) with extant verse 15; and Wadi Murabba'at Minor Prophets (Mur88; MurXIIProph; 75–100 CE) with extant verses 1–15.

There is also a translation into Koine Greek known as the Septuagint, made in the last few centuries BC. Extant ancient manuscripts of the Septuagint version include Codex Vaticanus (B; B; 4th century), Codex Sinaiticus (S; BHK: S; 4th century), Codex Alexandrinus (A; A; 5th century) and Codex Marchalianus (Q; Q; 6th century). Fragments cumulatively containing all verses of this chapter (a revision of the Septuagint) were found among the Dead Sea Scrolls, i.e., Naḥal Ḥever (8ḤevXIIgr; 1st century CE) with extant verses 9–10.

A Call to Penitence (2:1–3)
Following a tradition of Amos, a call of penitence is given after the threats of total disaster.

Oracles against the Nations (2:4–15)
The nations spoken here represent Israel's enemies at 'the four points of the compass', so the oracles may function to establish Yahweh as 'the Lord of the Four Quarters of the Earth' or 'the Lord of the whole world'.

Verse 4
For Gaza shall be forsaken,
And Ashkelon desolate;
They shall drive out Ashdod at noonday,
And Ekron shall be uprooted.

"Gaza", "Ashkelon", "Ashdod", "Ekron" – Four of the usual five leading cities of the Philistines are mentioned. Gath is omitted, being at this time under the dominion of Israel/Judah. King David had subjugated it.

Verse 5
Woe to the inhabitants of the seacoast,
The nation of the Cherethites!
The word of the Lord is against you,
O Canaan, land of the Philistines:
"I will destroy you;
So there shall be no inhabitant."
 "Cherethites" refers to the Cretans, a name applied to the Philistines as sprung from Crete. Philistine means "an emigrant."

See also

Related Bible parts: 2 Kings 22, Jeremiah 47, Amos 1, Zechariah 9

References

Sources

External links

Jewish translations:
 Zephaniah (Judaica Press) translation with Rashi's commentary at Chabad.org
Christian translations:
Online Bible at GospelHall.org (ESV, KJV, Darby, American Standard Version, Bible in Basic English)
  Various versions

02
Ekron
Ashdod
History of Gaza City
Ashkelon